Purabi Roy ( née Mukherjee; ; born 12 July 1941) is an Indian multi-disciplinary researcher, author, and an eminent scholar in Russian language and history. She has been visiting Professor at Moscow State University and Saint Petersburg State University in Russian Federation from 2000 to 2006. She is acknowledged as one of the foremost and veteran researchers on Subhas Chandra Bose and a former member of Indian Council of Historical Research (2015 to 2018).

Family background and education 

Purabi Roy was born to Peary Mohan Mukherjee and Radha Rani Mukherjee on 12 July 1941 in Calcutta, India. Her father Peary Mukherjee was the President of Calcutta Club in 1955 and was also a member of the Central Board of Directors, RBI, Eastern area from 1953 to 1955 along with B.M.Birla, O.T.Jenkins, Jiban Krishna Mitter and Dr. Bimala Churn Law.    

She received her education at St. John's Diocesan Girls' Higher Secondary School and graduating from Scottish Church College in 1962 under the University of Calcutta she then completed her MA from Jadavpur University in 1964 and Ph.D. in Philology at the Institute of Oriental Studies of the Russian Academy of Sciences in 1974 before being taught at Jadavpur University.

Academic career

In 1995, Asiatic Society sent a three-member team led by Purabi Roy along with Hari Vasudevan and professor Sobhanlal Datta Gupta to Moscow for the collection of documents on  Indo-Soviet relations from the period 1917 to 1947 as a protocol signed between the Institute of Oriental Studies of the Russian Academy of Sciences and The Asiatic Society. As a team member, Purabi Roy worked in the (GARF) or State Archive of the Russian Federation, (RGVIA) or Russian State Military Historical Archive and in the (MID) or the Archives of the Ministry of External Affairs.

On her return, Roy joined The Asiatic Society as a Research Professor and the first volume of the checklist on  Indo-Soviet relations was published by The Asiatic Society in 1997 under the title Indo-Russian Relations: 1917-1947. Checklist of Documents. Vol. I.

A specialist of Russian language and politics, Professor Roy participated in various International seminars and conferences. Dr. Roy presented papers at the Institute of Oriental Studies Moscow in 1999, Oriental Faculty of Saint Petersburg State University in 2002, Hamburg University of Germany in 2003 and Lund University of Sweden in 2004. In 2012 Purabi Roy delivered her lecture at Humboldt University of Berlin on New findings on Subhas Chandra Bose based on her research material collected from Russian, German, British and Indian archives.

Research on Subhas Chandra Bose 

Till the beginning of the year 2023, there are many debatable versions of Subhas Chandra Bose's disappearance in 1945: 

 I) Plane crash in Taiwan 

 II) Ashes in Renkō-ji temple 

 III) Gumnami Baba 

But one of the versions, according to Russian state media Russia Beyond, attracts special attention which is "Soviet" version by Dr. Purabi Roy. It claimed Subhas Chandra Bose's existence in the Soviet Union in 1945.  

In the case of Bose's disappearance, Professor Roy claimed Bose was alive in Soviet Russia in 1950s. Though the most important file (File no. 12(226)/56-PM) on Subhas Chandra Bose after 1945, according to news report of Business Insider, had been destroyed in 1972.

Sugata Bose argued and goes with the air crash theory. Chandra Kumar Bose, the grand nephew of Subhas Chandra Bose claimed that the mystery surrounding Bose's disappearance was yet to be resolved.      

A group of people claimed that Gumnami Baba was Subhas Chandra Bose, rejected by Subhas Chandra Bose's grand nephew Sugata Bose and Chandra Kumar Bose. According to Dr. Purabi Roy,  every account of history should undergo clinical and unbiased scrutiny .

Bibliography 

Purabi Roy's recent works on Indian National Army published by The Asiatic Society on the eve of the 75th Anniversary of Indian Independence is 75th Anniversary of Indian National Army and Provisional Government (2021). She has also authored Indian National Army (2021) with Dr. Sarabindu Mukherjee.

Personal Life 

Purabi Roy was married to AITUC leader and Rajya Sabha MP Kalyan Roy.

References

External links
 
 Purabi Roy, WorldCat catalogue

Living people
1941 births
University of Calcutta alumni
Indian academics
Bengali Hindus
Bengali writers
21st-century Bengalis
Indian scholars
21st-century Indian scholars
Scholars from Kolkata
Indian writers
21st-century Indian non-fiction writers
Indian non-fiction writers
20th-century Indian writers